In enzymology, a tauropine dehydrogenase is an enzyme that catalyzes the chemical reaction

tauropine + NAD+ + H2O  taurine + pyruvate + NADH + H+

The 3 products of this enzyme are tauropine, NAD+, and H2O, whereas its 4 substrates are taurine, pyruvate, NADH, and H+.

This enzyme belongs to the family of oxidoreductases, specifically those acting on the CH-NH group of donors with NAD+ or NADP+ as acceptor.  The systematic name of this enzyme class is N2-(D-1-carboxyethyl)taurine:NAD+ oxidoreductase (taurine-forming). This enzyme is also called 2-N-(D-1-carboxyethyl)taurine:NAD+ oxidoreductase (taurine-forming).

References 

 

EC 1.5.1
NADH-dependent enzymes
Enzymes of unknown structure